Yusuf IV (died 1432) was the sixteenth Nasrid ruler of Granada in Al-Andalus on the Iberian Peninsula in 1432.  He was known as Yusuf Ibn al-Mawl, or in Spanish, Abenalmao.  A maternal grandson of Muhammad VI, Yusuf IV was placed on the throne of Granada on 1 January 1432 with the support of the Catholic King John II of Castille, in return for tribute and vassal status. He may be identical to Abenamar in the Romance of Abenamar, a medieval frontier romance describing the meeting with John II.

In 1431, there were several claimants to the throne of Granada.  King Muhammad IX had entered Iberia from Tunisia in 1428 or 1429, with the promise of Castilian support in overthrowing Muhammad VIII.  However, the Castilian Catholic King John II did not decisively support either, instead playing them against each other to obtain greater tribute and the concession of Granada as a vassal of Castile.  Muhammad VIII surrendered in 1429 and was killed in March 1431, leaving Muhammad IX on the throne, but without having reached an agreement with Castile.  John II continued to demand greater concessions, and would not offer a permanent peace.  Instead, he supported another candidate, Yusuf IV.  Yusuf agreed to tribute and to be John's vassal.

His son Aben Celim was the father of Cidi Hiaya Alnayar, later renamed Pedro de Granada, who married Cetimerien Venegas, later renamed María de Venegas, and had issue, including the Marquesses of Campotéjar (including Alessandro Grimaldi, Doge of Genoa) and the Marquesses of Casablanca and the Lords of the Majorat of la Torre Marquesses of Torre Alta.

Descendants

 Yusuf IV, Sultan of Granada (abt. 1370 – April 1432) ⚭ Fatima
Ibn Selim Abrahem al-Nayyar (Aben Celin), Wali of Almeria (? – aft. 1474) ⚭ 1441 Fatima 
Sidi Yahya Abu Zakariyya al-Nayyar (later Pedro de Granada) (Taha de Marchena, abt. 1442 – 6 February 1506) ⚭ 26 Jun 1460 Cetti Meriem (later Maria) Venegas, dau of Ridwan Venegas and Maryam al-Mawl
Ali Omar ibn Nazar (later Alonso de Granada Venegas) (abt. 1467 – 1534) ⚭ (1st) Juana de Mendoza ⚭ (2nd) Maria de Quesada
Pedro de Granada Venegas, 1st Señor de Campotéjar (Granada, 13 April 1502 – Granada, 26 October 1565), ⚭ (1st) Maria Rengifo de Avila ⚭ (2nd) Maria de Mendoza, Señora de La Frontera, ancestor of the Marquesses of Campotéjar
Francisco de Granada Venegas, Captain of cavalry
Egas de Granada Venegas, Knight of Santiago
Felipe de Granada Venegas, Brother of the order of Santo Domingo
Maria de Granada Venegas, Nun
Ana de Granada Venegas, Nun
Isabel de Granada Venegas, Lady-in-waiting to the Empress
Diego de Granada Venegas (from 2nd wife), Captain of infantry
Garcia de Granada Venegas ⚭ Guiomar de Alarcón
Gabriel de Granada Venegas, Soldier
Luís de Granada Venegas, Soldier
Leonor de Granada Venegas ⚭ Luis Maza y Maza (?–1608), ancestor of the Marquesses of Casablanca
Isabel de Granada Venegas
Brianda de Granada Venegas ⚭ Alonso Belvis de Baho, left descendants
Nasr (later Fernando) de Granada
Equivila ⚭ Abu Abdallah Muhammad XIII (abt. 1440 – abt. 1494)
Ahmed Abenhami, lord of the taha of Luchar
Equivila al-Nayyara ⚭ Ali Abu Muhammad Aliaudili

References

Sultans of Granada
15th-century monarchs in Europe
1432 deaths
15th century in Al-Andalus
Year of birth unknown
15th-century Arabs